DWSJ (97.7 FM), broadcasting as 97.7 Bambi FM, is a radio station owned and operated by Tamaraw Broadcasting Network. The station's studio and transmitter are located along National Highway, Brgy. Labangan, San Jose, Occidental Mindoro.

References

Radio stations established in 1998